Tetragonoderus kaszabi is a species of beetle in the family Carabidae. It was described by Basilewsky in 1987.

References

kaszabi
Beetles described in 1987